Frank Goldsmith (1878–1967) was a British Conservative Party politician.

Frank or Francis Goldsmith may also refer to:

Frank John William Goldsmith (1902–1982), Titanic survivor
Zac Goldsmith, member of the House of Lords and former mayoral candidate for London
Francis Goldsmith (MP for Chippenham), MP for Mitchell, Chippenham and Helston
Francis Edward Goldsmith, medical doctor in South Australia